Park Jae-Hyun (born 29 October 1980) is a South Korean footballer who currently plays for Samut Songkhram F.C.

Career
Park has played for K-League side Incheon United from 2005 to 2009 season, and previously played for K-League side Daegu FC, Ulsan Hyundai Mipo Dockyard Dolphin and Yongin City FC in the Korea National League. Also he played for Ethnikos Piraeus in the Greek Beta Ethniki but went back to his previous team Ulsan Hyundai Mipo Dockyard in 6 months.

Sporting Goa
On January 18, 2012 Park officially signed for Sporting Clube de Goa in the I-League in India and made his debut the next day.

Club history
 2003 Daegu FC
 2004 Ulsan Hyundai Mipo Dockyard Dolphin
 2005-2009 Incheon United
 2010 Ethnikos Piraeus
 2010 Ulsan Hyundai Mipo Dockyard Dolphin
 2011 Yongin City FC
 2012 Sporting Goa
 2012-2013 Samut Songkhram F.C.

Club career statistics

References

External links

1980 births
Living people
South Korean footballers
South Korean expatriate footballers
Daegu FC players
Incheon United FC players
Ethnikos Piraeus F.C. players
Sporting Clube de Goa players
Park Jae-hyun
K League 1 players
I-League players
Korea National League players
Park Jae-hyun
Expatriate footballers in Greece
Expatriate footballers in India
Expatriate footballers in Thailand
South Korean expatriate sportspeople in Greece
South Korean expatriate sportspeople in India
South Korean expatriate sportspeople in Thailand
Association football forwards